Line 10, also known as the Bantian line of the Shenzhen Metro began construction at the end of 2015. The line opened on 18 August 2020. It connects the Futian Checkpoint to Shuangyong Street. In the southern terminus of the line, a 555 meters long and 50.5 meters wide double deck underground depot capable of storing 16 trains will be constructed.

History 
Line 10 was originally a low priority line to be constructed in the long term future called Line 16. In 2011, the Shenzhen Municipal Government approved the Longgang District Government to start the preliminary work on Line 10. On 2013, the Shenzhen Municipal Government renumbered Line 16 into Line 10 and included it in the Phase III expansion. The original Shenzhen Metro Line 10 was renumbered to Line 12 planned to be built in Phase IV. This was done to fast track the construction of the line to ease the pressure on Line 4 and accommodate further growth of the Longgang area. According to the original plan, the northern section of Line 10 runs through Fenggang town of the neighboring Dongguan City. Due to legal and government coordination problems, Line 10 will temporarily terminate in Pinghu, with capability to extend further north into Dongguan in the future. Further into construction, the line was redesigned to handle 8 car trains instead of the original specification of 6 cars to increase the line's ability to handle the growing transport demand in Shenzhen.

Opening timeline

Service routes
  —  (Before 11:00 PM, expect working days peak hours)
  —  (Working days peak hours only)
  —  (Working days peak hours only)
  →  (One way, from 11:00 PM to 11:30 PM)

Stations

References

Shenzhen Metro lines
Railway lines opened in 2020